William Dillingham may refer to:

 William P. Dillingham (1843–1923), American attorney and politician
 William Dillingham (academic) (c. 1617–1689), English academic and poet